The Arado E.377 was a remote-controlled glide bomb with powered and non-powered variants manufactured by Arado Flugzeugwerke.

References

Further reading

Guided missiles